The Oxford Research Encyclopedias (OREs), which includes 25 encyclopedias in different areas, is an encyclopedic collection published by Oxford University Press in print and online. Its website was entirely free during an initial development period of several years. Now there is a fee to access articles on this site, although a portion remains freely accessible. Three of encyclopedias resulted from a collaboration between Oxford University Press and National Association of Social Workers Press, American Institute of Physics, and International Studies Association.

Encyclopedias

References 

Oxford University Press reference books
Encyclopedias